Raja is a 2019 Indian Bhojpuri language action romantic drama film directed by Sanjay Shrivastava and produced by Mukesh Gupta. It stars Pawan Singh, Priti Biswas and Chandani Singh in the lead roles. Diya Singh, Satyaprakash, Sanjay Verma, Mukesh Gupta and others play supporting roles. Sambhavna Seth make a special appearance.

Cast
Pawan Singh as Raja
Priti Biswas as Kajal
Diya Singh as Geetanjali
Satyaprakash as Tandav
 Aryan Vaid as Munna Singh (Tandav's brother)
 Surya Dwivedi as Geetanjali's husband
 Sanjeev Mishra as Constable Shambhoo
Sanjay Verma as Constable Laddu
 Sambhavna Seth as special appearance in a song
Chandani Singh as special appearance in a song
Mukesh Gupta as Constable

Music
The music of the film is composed by Chhote Baba with lyrics written by Rajesh Mishra, Sumit Singh Chandravanshi and Raj Yadav. It is produced under the Wave Music Bhojpuri label.

Marketing
First-look poster of "Raja" was released on 19 October 2018 at Pawan Singh's official account of Instagram.

Trailer of this film was released on 30 October 2018 at official YouTube channel of "Wave Music" and it received 5.5 million views on YouTube.

References

2010s Bhojpuri-language films